Sudan Airways Flight 139 was a Sudan Airways passenger flight that crashed on 8 July 2003 at Port Sudan. The Boeing 737 aircraft was operating a domestic scheduled Port Sudan–Khartoum passenger service. Some 15 minutes after takeoff, the aircraft lost power in one of its engines, which prompted the crew to return to the airport for an emergency landing. In doing so, the pilots missed the airport runway, and the airplane descended until it hit the ground, disintegrating after impact. Of the 117 people aboard, 116 died.

Aircraft 
The aircraft involved in the accident was a Boeing 737-2J8C, c/n 21169, registered ST-AFK. Powered by two Pratt & Whitney JT8D-7 engines, it had its maiden flight on 29 August 1975, and was delivered new to Sudan Airways on 15 September 1975. At the time of the accident, the aircraft was almost 28 years old.

Accident 
The airplane had departed Port Sudan at 4:00 am (UTC+3), bound for Khartoum. The pilot radioed about ten minutes after take-off about a problem with one of the engines, and that he would return to the airport to make an emergency landing. However, the plane plummeted into the ground before returning to the airfield and immediately caught fire.

All but one of the 117 occupants of the aircraft— most of them Sudanese— perished in the accident. There were three Indians, a Briton, a Chinese, an Emirati, and an Ethiopian among the dead as well. A two-year-old boy was the sole survivor.

Then-Sudanese foreign minister Mustafa Osman Ismail raised the trade embargo imposed by the U.S. government in 1997 as a contributing factor to the accident, claiming the airline was unable to get spare parts for the maintenance of its fleet because of sanctions. The aircraft involved in the accident, in particular, had not been serviced for years.

See also
Aviation accidents and incidents
Sudan Airways Flight 109

References

2003 disasters in Sudan
Sudan Airways accidents and incidents
Aviation accidents and incidents in Sudan
Aviation accidents and incidents in 2003
Accidents and incidents involving the Boeing 737 Original
Airliner accidents and incidents caused by pilot error
Airliner accidents and incidents caused by mechanical failure
2003 in Sudan
July 2003 events in Africa